Tamati R. Tua (born 26 November 1997) is a New Zealand rugby union player who plays for the  in the Bunnings NPC and the Brumbies in Super Rugby. His position of choice is centre.

References 

New Zealand rugby union players
1997 births
Living people
Northland rugby union players
Blues (Super Rugby) players
Rugby union centres
Rugby union wings
ACT Brumbies players